Lawrence C. Loh is a Canadian physician who is currently serving as Executive Director and Chief Executive Officer of the College of Family Physicians of Canada. 

He formerly served as Medical Officer of Health for the Regional Municipality of Peel during the COVID-19 pandemic.

Early life and education 

Loh grew up in London, Ontario to Malaysian parents of Chinese descent. He grew up speaking English at home and not Mandarin. When Loh was 14, the family briefly moved back to Malaysia in Petaling Jaya for five years. After relocating back to London, Ontario Loh attended University of Western Ontario for his undergraduate degree and also medical school. He subsequently completed residency at the University of Toronto in Public Health and Preventive Medicine.

Career 
Loh practiced family medicine in Brampton before specializing in public health. He subsequently worked in public health agencies at all three levels of government in two different provinces before being offered the job of Associate Medical Officer of Health for Peel Region in 2016 by Eileen de Villa (then Medical Officer of Health for Peel, who later joined Toronto Public Health).

Academic career 
Loh is an adjunct professor at the University of Toronto Dalla Lana School of Public Health.

Medical Officer of Health during COVID-19 

Loh was the Medical Officer of Health for Peel Region throughout the first two years of COVID-19 pandemic in the Regional Municipality of Peel. In April 2021, Loh notably broke from the approach taken by the province and ordered Peel Region schools closed, as well as an Amazon Fulfillment Facility closed, both of which were accomplished through section 22 orders.

During Asian Heritage Month in May 2021, Loh was recognized in the Senate of Canada by Senator Victor Oh. In his intervention, Senator Oh hailed Loh as a hero in the community, citing that Loh's "forward thinking and resolve [...] were instrumental in containing COVID-19 transmission in one of the country's hardest Regions."

The Key to the City of Mississauga was presented to Loh on March 3, 2022 by Mayor Bonnie Crombie to recognize his role in the city's pandemic response.

References 

Living people
People from London, Ontario
University of Western Ontario alumni
Canadian public health doctors
Academic staff of the University of Toronto
Canadian health officials
21st-century Canadian civil servants
21st-century Canadian physicians
Year of birth missing (living people)